KV 1 may refer to:

KV 1, designations for the works of two classical music composers:
 six works in the original Köchel Verzeichnis by Wolfgang Amadeus Mozart
 a keyboard sonata by Domenico Scarlatti
KV-1, the first model of the Kliment Voroshilov tank, deployed by the Soviets in World War II
KV1, the tomb of Pharaoh Ramesses VII in the Valley of the Kings, Egypt
KV1, a variant of the Jackson King V electric guitar